The Tailor from Torzhok is a 1925 Soviet silent comedy film directed by Yakov Protazanov and starring Igor Ilyinsky. The picture was commissioned as publicity for the State Lottery Loan.

Plot
The film takes place in Soviet Russia during the NEP in a small provincial town. Petya Petelkin is a humble tailor of a sewing workshop belonging to the widow Shirinkina. The widow decides to marry her employee and Petya buys a lottery ticket hoping to win so that he can present her with a fancy gift.

He wins the big prize, starts dreaming of having his own shop, but the winning ticket disappears and passes from hand to hand. This is the beginning of a series of comic adventures. Petya is on the verge of committing suicide, but eventually everything ends well.

Cast
 Igor Ilyinsky - Petya Petelkin
 Olga Zhizneva - Young Lady
 Anatoly Ktorov - Young Man
 Vera Maretskaya - Katya
 Lidiya Deykun - Widow Shirinkina
 Iosif Tolchanov		
 Serafima Birman - Neighbor
 Eva Milyutina
 Vladimir Uralsky - Labour Union official

See also
The Three Million Trial
A Kiss from Mary Pickford
Miss Mend

References
.
.

External links

1926 comedy films
1926 films
Soviet comedy films
Russian comedy films
1925 films
Gorky Film Studio films
Soviet black-and-white films
Russian silent feature films
Films directed by Yakov Protazanov
Articles containing video clips
Soviet silent feature films
1925 comedy films
Russian black-and-white films
1920s Russian-language films
Silent comedy films